A grounding kit  (or earthing kit) can be described as a kind of lightning protector which avoids lightning punctures on cables. It is used for grounding /earthing coaxial cables of copper or aluminium on antenna installations for telecommunication (mobile communications).

Construction

Grounding kits / Earthing kits are composed of two main components, a clamp and a cable. The clamp will be screwed on a coaxial cable and in case of lightning strokes in the antenna installation, the voltage will be diverted over a ripple in the clamp with the combined cable and will be earthed / grounded by this way.

The clamps of the grounding kits / earthing kits are composed of an ozone- and UV-resistant rubber coat with a device where the ripple can be lodged. The tin-plated ripple with a special alloying enables the bridging over big tolerances between kit and coaxial cable which is important for a best possible voltage transmission. The ripple to the skinned coaxial cable has a low contact resistance between 0.10 and 0.15 mΩ. It also enables a better length compensation as well as even and low contact pressures, which avoids damages on the coaxial cable. These characteristics  are known as relaxation behaviour.

Assembly
For assembling a grounding kit / earthing kit with integrated cable lug the coaxial cable is skinned, the grounding kit / earthing kit is set and tightened by a screw.

References
 Wiesinger, Johannes; Blitzforschung und Blitzschutz (Lightning Research and Lightning Protection) / Johannes Wiesinger. - München [u.a.] : Oldenbourg [u.a.], 1972. - 87 S. : Ill., graph. Darst. - (Abhandlungen und Berichte / Deutsches Museum ; 1972,1/2) 
 Hasse, Peter; Wiesinger, Johannes; Handbuch für Blitzschutz und Erdung (Handbook for Lighting Protection and Earthing) (4.Auflage, 4 Edition): Pflaum Verlag, 1993 
 Hasse, Peter; Wiesinger, Johannes; EMV Blitzschutzzonenkonzept (EMC Concept for Lighting Protection Areas) : Pflaum Verlag, 1994

Telecommunications infrastructure